Drepanolejeunea is a genus of liverworts belonging to the family Lejeuneaceae.

The genus has almost cosmopolitan distribution.

Species

Species:

Drepanolejeunea actinogyna 
Drepanolejeunea aculeata 
Drepanolejeunea anderssonii

References

Lejeuneaceae
Porellales genera